The Forensic Science Graduate Program at Marshall University (Huntington, West Virginia) is a two-year academic program leading to a Master of Science degree in Forensic Science. The program is accredited by FEPAC, the Forensic Science Education Programs Accreditation Commission, and AAFS, the American Academy of Forensic Sciences, and is the only graduate program in the U.S. housed with a state Combined DNA Index System (CODIS) facility.

The graduate program was created in 1994 through collaboration of the Marshall University School of Medicine and the West Virginia State Police. It admits approximately 20 students each year.

Official web site: http://forensics.marshall.edu

Forensic Science Graduate Program